Charles Nelson (July 4, 1835 – December 13, 1891) was a prominent businessman and distiller in Middle Tennessee who was well known for his contributions to the banking, rail, music, and whiskey industries, among others. Nelson was the owner of Nelson's Greenbrier Distillery, which until American Prohibition, was one of the largest producers of whiskey in the United States.

Early life

Nelson was born on July 4, 1835, in Hagenow, a small town in the Mecklenburg-Schwerin state of northern Germany. He was the oldest of six children whose father was a successful soap and candle manufacturer. In 1850, the Nelsons embarked for the United States on the Helena Sloman, with Nelson’s father converting all of the family’s wealth to gold that he carried on his person, concealed by clothing he had made especially for that purpose. During the voyage, the Helena Sloman encountered storms with gale-force winds, which resulted in many of the passengers being thrown overboard – The Nelson patriarch was one of these passengers, and with the weight of his family’s fortune strapped to his person, he was pulled to the bottom of the Atlantic Ocean. Charles, along with his mother, brother, and four sisters, arrived in New York City with nothing but the clothes on their backs. While the mother looked after the young children, Charles and his brother found work with Hayes & Schultz Co., a producer of soap and candles in New York City. The family remained in New York for approximately two years before relocating to Cincinnati, Ohio, where Nelson began working as a butcher, an experience which later helped him to open a grocery store under the name Blersch & Nelson.

Move to Nashville

In 1857, Charles moved to Nashville, Tennessee, opening another grocery branch under the name Nelson & Pfeiffer. Nelson’s store quickly flourished, and became known especially for three products: coffee, meat, and whiskey. Nelson saw whiskey as the most profitable of his products, and began to concentrate solely on the production and bottling of his spirit. Among his more noteworthy sales techniques, it is known that Charles was one of the first to sell whiskey by the bottle rather than the jug or barrel. According to family records, Nelson encouraged his coffee delivery boy, Joel Cheek, to take his blend to the Maxwell House Hotel in downtown Nashville, where it later was famously proclaimed as “good to the last drop”. Nelson also encouraged his butcher, Horace G. Hill, to start his own business, which became known as H.G. Hill Food Stores and continues to operate as a Nashville-based company.

The beginnings of a distillery

Under the company name Chas. Nelson & Co., Nelson sought to expand the production of his whiskey – He had begun distilling his product through a contract distiller in the Nashville area before purchasing the Green Brier Distillery in Greenbrier, Tennessee, a small town in the surrounding Robertson County area, in 1867.

The distillery, which was commonly known as “Old Number Five” due to the fact that it was registered distillery number five and was located in the fifth tax district, quickly saw its production increase under Nelson’s leadership, eventually becoming the largest producer of Tennessee whiskey in the county. Nelson’s Green Brier Distillery’s increased production capacity was due, at least in part, to the H.H. Kirk patent for improved distillation that Charles Nelson bought in 1868. Although Nelson did not own the distillery outright until 1867, his whiskey was trademarked in 1860, making it one of the oldest trademarked liquors in the United States. The popularity of the brand, “Nelson’s Green Brier Tennessee Whiskey” was growing at such a rapid rate, that by 1885, the distillery was producing 380,000 gallons of whiskey per year, making it the largest producer in Robertson County. In comparison, the annual production capacity of Jack Daniel’s distillery in Lynchburg, Tennessee was 23,000 gallons. Charles Nelson was also on the forefront of marketing and advertising at the time, giving away sets of calendars with pictures of beautiful women, originally painted by artists such as Henri Rondel, G.T. Collins, and Angelo Asti (known as one of the fathers of pin-up art), to promote his brand.

Other business ventures

Nelson was also highly involved in ventures outside of distilling whiskey, such as music, banking and rail.. In fact, Nelson’s Green Brier Distillery was the primary reason that the small town of Greenbrier had a rail station built in order to transport ingredients and products to and from the distillery. He was also one of the founders of both the Nashville Trust Company and the Nashville Musical Union, and the first president of each of those organizations.

“Nelson felt strongly about the creation of such a company for the city that by this time was growing at a rapid rate. Mr. Nelson was in the fullest sense a public-spirited citizen. Every enterprise intended for the good of Nashville received his hearty support and generous help. He was a man not of words but of actions. As an example of this it may be mentioned that when it was proposed several years ago to establish a Musical Union and a meeting was held at the Maxwell House for that purpose, Mr. Nelson arose after everyone else had spoken and announced that he had come to join the enterprise, and that he wished all the members of his family to be enrolled as life members, and subscribed $200 on the spot. He was the Union’s first President. That was Mr. Nelson’s way, he went into everything heartily, and to this may be attributed the success that attended every enterprise with which he was connected. Mr. Nelson’s charity was bounded only by his means, or by the cause that appealed to him. He never gave grudgingly, but with a lavish hand.” Daily American Newspaper (December 14, 1891)

Personal life

Nelson’s first son, Charles Nelson Jr. was the result of his first marriage, which was short-lived due to the death of his wife. He married his second wife, Louisa Rohlfing on March 4, 1863, and except for a brief stint in Cincinnati, Ohio, the Nelsons resided in Nashville. His second marriage produced two sons and three daughters (William, Henry, Emma, Alice, and Louise), all of whom were college educated; the boys at Harvard University and the girls at Vassar College. He was survived by his wife Louisa and all six of his children, including Charles, Jr.

His obituary said:
The home life of Mr. Nelson was ideally beautiful. Business cares never crossed the threshold. When he hung up his hat he laid down his cares, burying himself in the bosom of his family. He was not only a father upon whom his children could lean but he was to them a companion in whom they could confide and with whom they could make free. He was to them at one and the same time father, brother, sweetheart and friend. Stern when sternness was necessary, yet gentleness was the prevailing ingredient of his royal nature. He ruled by the divine attribute of love, and if his children feared him it was not the fear that he would visit punishment upon them, but the fear that they might displease him. In all family matters he would with knightly grace defer to his beloved wife, whose word to him was law. Seldom do we find a happier more perfect home than this one. All that cultivated taste could suggest or wealth provide were to be found in this beautiful home. At Christmas time, and on July 4, Mr. Nelson’s birthday, the children were summoned whether at school in Massachusetts or New York, to the family gathering. These were the two days when joy was unconfined. Until Mr. Nelson’s children were grown, Mr. Nelson had been accustomed to provide a Christmas tree and a surprise for the children and the good wife. When the children were grown they provided the Christmas tree and prepared surprises for the father. Thus the family was bound together by ties that only death could sever, and even death cannot break such bonds, for they live in the heart always. 
Mr. Nelson, accompanied by his wife and children, has several times visited Europe, and on each occasion he paid his native town a visit, always bestowing upon the place some token as a mark of love and affection for his first home. It is said that whenever he visited Hagenow the natives turned out en masse to greet him. This was natural, for he was a son of whom the little German town could well be proud, and upon whom such an honor was worthily bestowed. Though foreign born, Mr. Nelson always declared himself, heart and soul, an American. He was loyal to the country of his adoption, while cherishing a natural and proper affection for the land of his birth.  -Daily American Newspaper (December 14, 1891)

1835 births
1891 deaths
People from Hagenow
Grand Duchy of Mecklenburg-Schwerin